USS Dean may refer to:

 , a Continental Navy frigate in commission from 1778 to 1783, renamed USS Hague in 1782
 , a United States Navy patrol boat in commission from 1917 to 1918

United States Navy ship names